The 2017 Houston Dash season is the team's fourth season as an American professional women's soccer team in the National Women's Soccer League.

Team information

Rosters 
Players and squad numbers last updated on June 17, 2017.Note: Flags indicate national team as has been defined under FIFA eligibility rules. Players may hold more than one non-FIFA nationality.

Pre-season and friendlies

Competitions

NWSL

League standings

Results by round

Matches

Statistics

Appearances

Goalscorers 

Last updated: June 28, 2017

Player transactions

Retirements

Honors and awards

NWSL Monthly Awards

NWSL Player of the Month

NWSL Team of the Month

NWSL Weekly Awards

NWSL Player of the Week

NWSL Save of the Week

NWSL Goal of the Week

References 

Houston Dash seasons
Houston Dash
Houston Dash
Houston Dash